Slieve Meelmore is a mountain located in the Mourne Mountains. It is a popular hiking destination and is just under 6 mile east of the village of Hilltown. The mountain stands at a height of 680 m (2230 ft) and is the 7th highest mountain in Northern Ireland, it is located in the West Mournes with Slieve Meelbeg to the south and Slieve Bearnagh to the east. The Mourne Wall passes over its summit.

The seventh "Seven"
The mountain is mistakenly referred to as the seventh "Seven" in the annual Mourne Sevens challenge walk. This one-day event requires participating hillwalkers to visit all summits in the Mourne Mountains which are higher than 700m. When the event was first organised in 1992, a published map for the area displayed a spot height of 704m at the mountain's summit. In 2004, it was discovered by a participant that the actual spot height is several metres less than the required 700m. This error has since been corrected on more recent editions of the map, thereby removing the mountain's status as a true "Seven".

References

Geography of County Down